The J.W. Randolph School was constructed in 1928 as a public school for African-American students in Pass Christian, Mississippi.  The building was vacated as a school in 2000.  In 2006, the structure was designated a Mississippi Landmark.

History
Around 1920, a Black civic organization petitioned for a new school to be built for African-American students in Pass Christian.  In 1927-28, the school was constructed at a cost of $24,000. Construction financing was provided through public funding and private donations, including the Rosenwald Fund.   Originally designated as the Harrison County Training School, the name was changed in 1939 to honor a former school principal, J.W. Randolph.  When school segregation came to an end in 1969, the building was rededicated as the Pass Christian Middle School.  After 2000, the building no longer served as a public school.

Between 2000 and 2005, the building complex was used as a Senior Citizen Center, Boys and Girls Club, and a branch office for Harrison County Human Services.

In August 2005, the structure was severely damaged by winds and storm surge from Hurricane Katrina.  Although considered for demolition after the storm, the school was saved by a coalition of former students, community activists, and preservationists. Restoration efforts began in 2009 with funding from public and private grants.  The renovated school was dedicated on January 22, 2013, to be used as a senior citizen center and for social events.

References

Mississippi Landmarks
Schools in Harrison County, Mississippi
Rosenwald schools
1928 establishments in Mississippi
School buildings completed in 1928